Arlindo Correia Pacheco (born 30 December 1899, date of death unknown) was a Brazilian footballer. He played in one match for the Brazil national football team in 1919. He was also part of Brazil's squad for the 1919 South American Championship.

References

External links
 

1899 births
Year of death missing
Brazilian footballers
Brazil international footballers
Place of birth missing
Association footballers not categorized by position